Mere Hüseyin Pasha (died July 1624) was an Ottoman statesman of Albanian origin. He was two times Grand Vizier of the Ottoman Empire in 1622 and 1623, and previously the Ottoman governor of Egypt between 1620 and 1622. His epithet "Mere!" comes from the word for "Take it!" in Albanian; he was nicknamed so because of the many times he ordered his men to "take [the heads]" of his opponents, i.e. execute them. He was purportedly the only grand vizier who did not speak Ottoman Turkish or Osmanlica.

Life
Hüseyin Pasha was an Albanian from the region of İpek, in present-day Kosovo. He may have been a progenitor of the Begolli family. It is purported that he never learned to speak Turkish, a very rare occurrence in the Turkish-controlled Ottoman Empire.

He began his government career as the aşcıbaşı (chief cook) of Satırcı Mehmed Pasha, soon becoming a member of the sipahi corps. He then took on a series of increasingly high level government posts, until July 1620, when he was appointed the governor of Egypt Eyalet and made a vizier.

As the governor of Egypt, Hüseyin Pasha's manners were described as "rough and unpolished." He was ill for the first few months of his term, but when he recovered, he threw a feast for his children and received many gifts, although he sent most of the gifts given to him by the wealthy back. While he was governor, the flooding of the Nile caused widespread drought in Egypt, leading to his dismissal from the office in March or April 1622. His defterdar (finance minister) Hasan, having become the acting governor (kaymakam) after Hüseyin Pasha's removal, accused him of having embezzled money from the treasury and crops from the granary and prevented him from leaving Cairo. Hüseyin Pasha paid 25,000 gold pieces (dinars; half of the claimed amount) and claimed that a local, who had disparaged him after his removal from office, should pay the rest, claiming that the Money Lender was indebted to Hüseyin Pasha in the same amount, with this obtaining permission to leave. However, when the authorities went to the Money Lender to demand payment of the money that Hüseyin Pasha had said he owed him, the Lender claimed that he had already paid Hüseyin Pasha. When this response was made known to Hüseyin Pasha, he claimed that he was not at fault and the Lender was lying, but agreed to pay the remaining 25,000 gold pieces in exchange for the Lender being brought to him. The acting governor accepted this proposal and delivered the Lender to Hüseyin Pasha, who tortured and killed him and took the 25,000 gold pieces by force. After these events, Hüseyin Pasha traveled to Romania Rumelia, not to be confused with modern-day Romania.

A few months later, on June 13, 1622, Hüseyin Pasha was appointed grand vizier for the first time, serving for less than a month until July 8, 1622, under sultan Mustafa I. The next year, the sultan appointed him grand vizier once more, from February 5, 1623, to August 30, 1623.

See also
 List of Ottoman Grand Viziers
 List of Ottoman governors of Egypt

References

Year of birth unknown
16th-century births
1624 deaths
Burials at Karacaahmet Cemetery
Ottoman governors of Egypt
17th-century Grand Viziers of the Ottoman Empire
17th-century Ottoman governors of Egypt
17th-century executions by the Ottoman Empire
Albanian Grand Viziers of the Ottoman Empire
Albanians from the Ottoman Empire
Executed people from the Ottoman Empire
Executed Albanian people
Politicians from Peja
Kosovo Albanians